Fortitude Valley, originally known as Hamlet of Fortitude Valley, was a Legislative Assembly electorate in the state of Queensland.

History

Fortitude Valley was one of the original sixteen electorates proclaimed in 1859. It was originally known as "Hamlet of Fortitude Valley", but the name was shortened to "Fortitude Valley" in the 1872 redistribution. Initially it was a single member constituency, but became a dual member constituency in 1885, reverting to a single member in the 1910 redistribution. The electorate was abolished in the 1959 redistribution, mostly being incorporated into the Electoral district of Brisbane and the Electoral district of Merthyr.

Notably, Fortitude Valley was the first electorate in any Australian parliament to be contested by a member of the labour movement, with William McNaughton Galloway, the president of the Brisbane Trades and Labour Council and secretary of the Seamen's Union, unsuccessfully contesting the 1888 by-election.

Members

The following members were elected:

See also
 Electoral districts of Queensland
 Members of the Queensland Legislative Assembly by year
 :Category:Members of the Queensland Legislative Assembly by name

References

Former electoral districts of Queensland
Constituencies established in 1860
1860 establishments in Australia
Constituencies disestablished in 1960
1960 disestablishments in Australia